Chevez Brandford Goodwin (born February 27, 1998) is an American professional basketball player for Aris Thessaloniki of the Greek Basket League. He previously played college basketball with the USC Trojans of the Pac-12 Conference, as well as for the College of Charleston Cougars and the Wofford Terriers.

High school career
Goodwin began his high school career at A. C. Flora High School in Columbia, South Carolina. For his sophomore season, he transferred to Hammond School in Columbia. As a junior, Goodwin helped lead his team to the SCISA 3A state championship. In his senior season, he averaged 18.9 points, 12.4 rebounds and 1.3 blocks, and shared The State Midlands Player of the Year honors with his teammate Seventh Woods.

College career
As a freshman at the College of Charleston, Goodwin averaged 2.3 points and 2.9 rebounds per game. For his sophomore season, he transferred to Wofford, and averaged 4.3 points and 4.3 rebounds per game after sitting out for a year as a redshirt due to transfer rules. On February 5, 2020, Goodwin scored a career-high 27 points in a 79–73 win against VMI. In his junior season, he averaged 11.9 points and 6.2 rebounds per game. Goodwin then moved to USC as a graduate transfer, choosing the Trojans over offers from Arkansas, Georgia, Houston and Xavier. As a senior, he averaged 5.6 points and 3.5 rebounds per game. Goodwin returned to USC for his additional year of eligibility, granted by the NCAA due to the COVID-19 pandemic.

Career statistics

College

|-
| style="text-align:left;"| 2016–17
| style="text-align:left;"| College of Charleston
| 35 || 5 || 9.8 || .515 || .000 || .379 || 2.9 || .1 || .2 || .5 || 2.3
|-
| style="text-align:left;"| 2017–18
| style="text-align:left;"| Wofford
| style="text-align:center;" colspan="11"|  Redshirt
|-
| style="text-align:left;"| 2018–19
| style="text-align:left;"| Wofford
| 35 || 0 || 13.3 || .585 || – || .333 || 4.3 || .2 || .2 || .3 || 4.3
|-
| style="text-align:left;"| 2019–20
| style="text-align:left;"| Wofford
| 35 || 35 || 21.8 || .642 || .000 || .512 || 6.2 || .9 || .3 || 1.1 || 11.9
|-
| style="text-align:left;"| 2020–21
| style="text-align:left;"| USC
| 33 || 1 || 14.9 || .538 || .000 || .534 || 3.5 || .5 || .3 || .3 || 5.6
|-
| style="text-align:left;"| 2021–22
| style="text-align:left;"| USC
| 34 || 34 || 24.5 || .570 || .000 || .471 || 6.4 || .6 || .4 || .5 || 11.0
|- class="sortbottom"
| style="text-align:center;" colspan="2"| Career
| 172 || 75 || 16.8 || .585 || .000 || .474 || 4.7 || .5 || .3 || .6 || 7.0

Professional career
On August 3, 2022, Goodwin signed his first professional contract overseas with Greek club Aris Thessaloniki.

Personal life
Goodwin's father, Charles, played college football for South Carolina State. Since high school, Goodwin has worn the No. 1 basketball jersey to honor his mother, Ronee Berry-Goodwin, who died when he was three years old.

See also
 List of NCAA Division I men's basketball career games played leaders

References

External links
USC Trojans bio
Wofford Terriers bio
College of Charleston Cougars bio

1998 births
Living people
Aris B.C. players
American men's basketball players
American expatriate basketball people in Greece
Basketball players from Columbia, South Carolina
Centers (basketball)
Power forwards (basketball)
College of Charleston Cougars men's basketball players
Wofford Terriers men's basketball players
USC Trojans men's basketball players